Frank D. Stringham (1872–1931) was Mayor of Berkeley, California from 1923 to 1927.  Mayor Stringham was notable for leading the effort to adopt the city manager form of government.  Prior to his becoming Mayor, Stringham served as Berkeley's City Attorney.  In 1928, Stringham was appointed to serve as a director on the board of the East Bay Municipal Utility District.  It was during his term as Mayor that the 1923 Berkeley Fire occurred.

Frank Stringham was born on December 9, 1872 in Topeka, Kansas.  He attended the University of California where his uncle, W. Irving Stringham was a professor of mathematics.  He graduated in 1895.

Stringham married Juliet Garber (died June 2, 1955) in 1905.  She was the daughter of a prominent local judge who had owned much of the land upon which the Claremont district was developed.  Frank Stringham and his wife donated some of the property to the City of Berkeley for a park which was named for her father: John Garber Park.  Frank Stringham began his law studies while working for Judge Garber's firm.  As an attorney, Frank Stringham had also been associated with former Berkeley Mayor Beverly Hodghead.
 
Stringham died at his Berkeley home on December 7, 1931, and was buried at the Mountain View Cemetery in Oakland.

References
 Berkeley Gazette, December 8, 1931

1872 births
1931 deaths
University of California, Berkeley alumni
Mayors of Berkeley, California
Lawyers from Berkeley, California